Ernest Arthur Bell CB (20 June 1926 – 11 June 2006) was an English botanist and chemist who was Director of the Royal Botanic Gardens, Kew from 1981 to 1988, the first biochemist to be appointed to the post.

Early life
Arthur Bell was born at Gosforth, Northumberland and was educated at Dame Allan's School, Newcastle upon Tyne. He took  a degree in Chemistry at Durham University and was awarded a doctorate at Trinity College Dublin in 1950.

Professional career
Bell started his career at ICI in 1946, as a research chemist. In 1947 he took up a research post at Trinity College, Dublin. In 1949 he became a lecturer in Biochemistry at King's College London, where he became Professor of Biology and head of the Department of Plant Sciences in 1972. He was vice-president of the Linnean Society from 1982 to 1986.

Honours
He was appointed a Companion of The Most Honourable Order of the Bath in 1987. In 1990 he was made an honorary fellow of Trinity College Dublin.

Personal life
He married Jean Ogilvie in 1952 and they had three children together – two sons and a daughter.

Death
He died at St George's Hospital, Tooting in 2006, aged 79.

References

1926 births
2006 deaths
20th-century British botanists
20th-century British chemists
Academics of King's College London
Alumni of Trinity College Dublin
Botanists active in Kew Gardens
Companions of the Order of the Bath
English biochemists
English botanists
Honorary Fellows of Trinity College Dublin
Imperial Chemical Industries people
People from Newcastle upon Tyne (district)
Alumni of King's College, Newcastle